Raindancing is the second solo studio album by English singer Alison Moyet, released on 6 April 1987 by CBS Records. It reached  2 on the UK Albums Chart and features the singles "Is This Love?", "Weak in the Presence of Beauty", "Ordinary Girl" and "Sleep Like Breathing". In the United States, Raindancing was released by Columbia Records with a different cover art and a reordered track listing.

Largely produced by Jimmy Iovine, the album includes contributions from various session musicians such as T. M. Stevens, Omar Hakim and Herb Alpert.

A deluxe edition of Raindancing was released on 25 November 2016 by BMG.

Background
Following the release of her successful debut album Alf, Moyet decided to move to Los Angeles, where she stayed for nearly a year. The move to the United States had been prompted by Moyet's manager, who himself had found work there for a year and suggested she relocate there too. Once settled in Los Angeles, Moyet's manager enlisted Jimmy Iovine to produce the majority of the Raindancing album.

The majority of songs that would appear on the album had already been written back in England. For some of these songs, Moyet teamed up with guitarist Rick Driscoll and keyboardist Jess Bailey. "Is This Love?" was co-written with David A. Stewart of Eurythmics while Moyet was living in Los Angeles. As a friend of Iovine's, Stewart had called into the studio to see Iovine, who suggested he and Moyet write a song together. To avoid problems with his publishers, Stewart's contribution was disguised under the pseudonym Jean Guiot. "Sleep Like Breathing" was written by David Freeman and Joseph Hughes of The Lover Speaks. The duo contributed three songs to the Raindancing sessions, though only "Sleep Like Breathing" would be included on the album. "Weak in the Presence of Beauty" was written by Michael Ward and Rob Clarke, and originally recorded by their band Floy Joy in 1986. Moyet chose to record her own version of the song for the album, but would later reveal that she only recorded it because she knew it would be a hit.

Raindancing was released in April 1987. Continuing her success in the United Kingdom, the album reached No. 2 and remained on the chart for 53 weeks. In America, the album peaked at No. 94, faring less well commercially than Alf. Across Europe and elsewhere, the album was a commercial success. It topped the charts in both New Zealand and Norway.

The album also spawned four singles. The lead single "Is This Love?" was released in November 1986 and reached No. 3 in the UK, while becoming a hit across Europe and beyond. However, the single failed to chart in the US where it was released in March 1987. "Weak in the Presence of Beauty" was the album's second single, released in February 1987. It reached No. 6 in the UK and was also another hit elsewhere. It was released as a single in America in August 1987 but failed to chart. "Ordinary Girl", the album's third single, was less successful commercially when released in May 1987, peaking at No. 43 in the UK and No. 22 in Ireland. The final single was Sleep Like Breathing", a duet with David Freeman. It peaked at No. 80 in the UK after being released in September 1987.

To promote the album, Moyet embarked on her only world tour. Although successful, Moyet would later describe the tour as "lack-lustre", while noting that it signalled her breakdown with her label CBS. In 1988, the success of the album contributed to Moyet receiving her second Brit Award for Best British Female Solo Artist. Despite the success of Raindancing, Moyet later revealed she was not happy with the album's American sound. Later recalling the album's period in 2007, Moyet felt that using an American producer and giving much control to engineers was a "bad move". Writing for her website, Moyet recalled: "I do like some of the songs but the conception of them was all wrong... what was written as jangly, English irony got the American session, pop treatment. I didn't involve myself in the 'sound'. I was driving on cruise control. It was made and not felt."

Critical reception

Upon release, Smash Hits said: "Ever since she made her first solo LP, Alf, Alison Moyet has been slagging it off for being a bit of a middle-of-the-road coffee table record, so it's surprising that Raindancing isn't really that different. There's less roaring singing and less emphasis on being intensely 'soulful' but these are still 10 fairly polite pop songs. Not that it's bad – most of it is in the same chug-along vein as the two singles, but it'd be nice if it didn't all sound so safe and predictable. The best songs, 'Ordinary Girl' and 'Stay', are, oddly enough, the two which sound rather like Yazoo."

American magazine Cash Box commented: "Moyet's disarmingly plaintive vocals haunt this inviting Jimmy Iovine production." Barry Walters of Spin wrote: "Enter the American mega-mainstream FM guru Jimmy Iovine to tip the scales on her new Raindancing. Gone for most part are the R&B grooves. Although synths still rule, there's nothing remotely Yaz-tech about them. Even when funk occasionally surfaces, as on 'You Got Me Wrong,' it's hammered out with an American rock drum sound that's pure MTV. There's a tangible effort to push Moyet into the 'til Tuesday camp of semisweet pop, especially on 'Weak in the Presence of Beauty'. But most of the originals triumph through Moyet's intimate presence, both as an intelligent songwriter and an anguised voice one never tires of." Musician stated: "Unlike its synth-smart predecessor, Raindancing lacks the instant appeal of Swain & Jolley's intellectualized dance music. But though the performances here take a bit more patience to appreciate, they're no less rewarding; if anything, Moyet's interpretive gifts have grown, and Jimmy Iovine's understated production takes pains not to get in the way. Which is why the likes of 'Sleep Like Breathing' or 'Weak in the Presence of Beauty' hold such lasting allure."

Jonathan Butler of People said: "Moyet's solo career has been like one of those baffling marriages in which you adore the wife but can't figure out what she sees in her oafish husband. It's hard to resist the British singer, who has a captivating voice, gracious, full-bodied and colored with a coppery glow. But it's easy to question some of her career choices. On both her solo records, her producers have dragged her out of her element and into the treacherous waters of corny pop sentiment. They mismatch her with too-fast beats that make Moyet sound frowsy and pedestrian." Bombay: The City Magazine stated: "Alf saw the last trace of Vince Clark influence as ex-Yazoo vocalist Alison Moyet set out on her own. Raindancing turns to others like Paul Young and Pet Shop Boys, to provide some breath-taking moments as Moyet strikes a balance between stand-off chic and espresso-warm emotions. And if Raindancing is outstanding for other reasons, they are simple: It has nothing to do with Only You." Billboard stated: "New disk, laced with a high-gloss sheen by Iovine, may produce the knockout for her. Silken single, 'Is This Love?' shows off her robust pipes well, but radio should also pounce on 'When I Say (No Giveaway)' and 'Weak in the Presence of Beauty.'"

In a review of the 2016 deluxe edition of Raindancing, Helena Adams of the music website Reflections of Darkness commented: "The purpose of Raindancing was clear: to establish Alison Moyet as the pop star across the big pond. Raindancing is a continuation of the 80s dance-disco beats that indeed, parades much more production that parlays with the synthetic. Raindancing fits the bar of commercial albums back then, the overproduction provides it with a poppy freshness that Alf lacked." Josh Lee of Attitude stated: "Big choruses that demand to be sung along to don't come more insistent than "Is This Love?" and "Weak in the Presence of Beauty but their singer wasn't as enthralled by the album as her fans." Gay Times writer Darren Howard wrote: "It's not that it's a bad album, it's just not very 'Moyet' in places. Having said that, it does contain the almighty 'Is This Love' and the beautiful 'Ordinary Girl' which both show Alison at her best."

Track listing

Personnel
 See InfoBox for full producer listing
 Associate Producer: Mike Shipley
 Recorded & Engineered By Joe Chiccarelli, John Fryer, Robert de la Garza & Mark Desisto
 Mixed By Jess Bailey, Alison Moyet, Scott Litt, Mike Shipley & Humberto Gatica
 Mastered By Vladimir "Vlado" Meller
 Richard Houghton – sleeve photography
 Rob O'Connor (Stylorouge) – design, art direction

Charts

Weekly charts

Year-end charts

Certifications

References

Bibliography

 

1987 albums
Albums produced by David A. Stewart
Albums produced by Jimmy Iovine
Alison Moyet albums
CBS Records albums
Columbia Records albums